In Classical Greek mythology, Taygete was a nymph, one of the Pleiades according to the Bibliotheca (3.10.1) and a companion of Artemis, in her archaic role as potnia theron, "Mistress of the animals", with its likely roots in prehistory. Mount Taygetos in Laconia, dedicated to the goddess, was her haunt.

The Taygetus mountain on the Peloponnese was named after her.

Mythology 
As he mastered each of the local nymphs one by one, Olympic Zeus pursued Taygete, who invoked her protectress Artemis. The goddess turned Taygete into a doe with golden horns, any distinction between the Titaness in her human form and in her doe form is blurred: the nymph who hunted the doe in the company of Artemis is the doe herself. As Pindar conceived the myth-element in his third Olympian Ode, "the doe with the golden horns, which once Taygete had inscribed as a sacred dedication to Artemis Orthosia", ("right-minded" Artemis) was the very Ceryneian Hind that Heracles later pursued. For the poet, the transformation was incomplete, and the doe-form had become an offering. Pindar, who was a very knowledgeable mythographer, hints that the mythic doe, even when slain and offered to Artemis, also continues to exist, to be hunted once again (although not killed) by Heracles at a later time.  Karl Kerenyi points out (The Heroes of the Greeks) "It is not easy to differentiate between the divine beast, the heroine and the goddess".

According to Pausanias (3.1.2, etc.) Taygete conceived Lacedaemon, the mythical founder of Sparta, through Zeus, and Eurotas. Pausanias noted, at Amyclae, that the rape of Taygete was represented on the throne.

According to Pseudo-Plutarch, Taygete was the wife of Lacedaemon, sometimes referred to as Sparta, whose name was given to the city of Sparta. Their son was named Himerus.

In a rare variant of the myth, Taygete was called the daughter of Agenor.

Notes

References
 Ruck, Carl A.P., and Danny Staples, 1994. The World of Classical Myth (Carolina Academic Press)
 Harry Thurston Peck, Harpers Dictionary of Classical Antiquities, 1898. Online version at the Perseus Digital Library: "Taygete"
 Robbins, Emmet. "Heracles, the Hyperboreans, and the Hind: Pindar, "OL. 3", Phoenix 36.4 (Winter 1982), pp. 295–305.

Pleiades (Greek mythology)
Divine women of Zeus
Women in Greek mythology
Metamorphoses into animals in Greek mythology
Arcadian characters in Greek mythology
Deeds of Artemis
Mythological deer
Laconian mythology